Muhiddin Kabiri, also known as Muhiddin Tilloevich Kabirov (20 July 1965) is a Tajik Muslim politician, former member of the parliament of Tajikistan and the chairman of the opposition Islamic Renaissance Party (IRPT) which was banned in Tajikistan in August 2015. Kabiri is fluent in Tajik, Persian, Arabic, Russian, and English.

Early life and career
Kabiri was born in the Faizobod District of Tajikistan into a devout Muslim family. During the country's civil war in 1992–1997, Kabiri lived in Russia and had a business there. Upon returning to Dushanbe in 1997, he became a close ally of Said Abdullo Nuri, the leader of the IRPT, becoming deputy chairman of the party in 2000. In 2005, he was elected to the parliament of Tajikistan through an IRPT party list.

Kabiri effectively led the IRPT since 2004 when Said Abdullo Nuri was diagnosed with cancer. Despite the resistance of many conservative members of the party, Nuri recommended Kabiri as his replacement, and Kabiri was elected the chairman of IRPT following Nuri's death in August 2006. Kabiri is credited with repairing ideological divisions within the party, strengthening it, and sidelining the more conservative and radical members of the party. In October 2011, he was reelected as chairman of the party.

After the IRPT gathered only 1,5% votes, and no seats in Parliament for first time in 15 years, Kabiri left the country amid widespread speculation that the party would be shut down by authorities. Kabiri's current whereabouts are unknown, although he is rumored to be in Turkey. The 50-year-old was last seen publicly at an international conference in Iran, where he attended the International Conference of Islamic Unity on December 27 and was seated next to the head of Tajikistan's state-backed Council of Islamic Ulema and other members of the official delegation from Tajikistan. Kabiri's colleagues have urged him not to return to Tajikistan from abroad, saying it was not safe and citing the mysterious assassination of another opposition leader, fugitive tycoon and opposition Group 24 founder Umarali Quvvatov, in Istanbul in March.

In August 2015, the Islamic Renaissance Party of Tajikistan was banned by the Tajik Justice Ministry.

References

Tajikistani politicians
1965 births
Living people
Tajikistani Islamists
Islamic Renaissance Party of Tajikistan politicians
Islamic democracy activists
Tajikistani expatriates
Tajikistani Muslims
Members of the Supreme Assembly (Tajikistan)
Tajik National University alumni
People from Districts of Republican Subordination